Agustín Daniel Rossi (born 21 August 1995) is an Argentine professional footballer who plays as a goalkeeper for Saudi Professional League club Al Nassr, on loan from Boca Juniors

Club career

Chacarita Juniors
Born in Buenos Aires, Rossi represented Chacarita Juniors as a youth. He made his first team debut on 2 April 2014, starting in a 1–3 away loss against Instituto, for the season's Copa Argentina.

Estudiantes de La Plata
Rossi moved to Estudiantes on 25 December 2014. He made his Primera División debut the following 18 April, playing the full 90 minutes in a 1–1 home draw against Rosario Central.

Defensa y Justicia (loan)
On 24 July 2016, Rossi was loaned to fellow top tier club Defensa y Justicia.

Boca Juniors
On 1 February 2017, Rossi was transferred to Boca Juniors for €1.17m.

Al Nassr (loan)
On 21 January 2023, Rossi moved to Saudi Professional League club Al Nassr on a six-month loan until 30 June 2023 as Boca Juniors decided to no to use the player anymore until the end of his contract. At the Saudi club Rossi will cover the injured David Ospina.

Flamengo
On 9 January 2023 Flamengo announced a contract being signed with Rossi from 1 July 2023 until 31 December 2027 as the current deal with Boca Juniors runs out in the end of June.

Career statistics
.

Honours
Boca Juniors
Primera División: 2016–17, 2017–18, 2022
Copa Argentina: 2019–20
Copa de la Liga Profesional: 2020, 2022

References

External links

1995 births
Living people
Argentine sportspeople of Italian descent
Footballers from Buenos Aires
Argentine footballers
Association football goalkeepers
Chilean Primera División players
Argentine Primera División players
Primera Nacional players
Saudi Professional League players
Chacarita Juniors footballers
Boca Juniors footballers
Estudiantes de La Plata footballers
Defensa y Justicia footballers
C.D. Antofagasta footballers
Club Atlético Lanús footballers
Al Nassr FC players
Argentine expatriate footballers
Argentine expatriate sportspeople in Chile
Argentine expatriate sportspeople in Saudi Arabia
Expatriate footballers in Chile
Expatriate footballers in Saudi Arabia
Argentina under-20 international footballers